The Fifth Legislative Assembly of Delhi was constituted on 28 December 2013 after the Delhi Legislative Assembly elections on 4 December 2013.

Election and Government formation

Total six national parties, eleven state parties, sixty registered (unrecognised) parties and other independent candidates contested for 70 assembly seats. With 31 seats, BJP emerged as the single largest party but fell short of the half way mark. BJP was closely followed by AAP. In absence of clear majority, Legislative Assembly of Delhi was hung. Being the single largest party, BJP approached the Lieutenant Governor of Delhi Najeeb Jung and refused to form a government. Thereafter, Indian National Congress offered "unconditional" support to the AAP. AAP initially rejected INC's support but later accepted it and formed the government with Arvind Kejriwal as the Chief Minister.

Electors

Candidates

Important members

List of members
Default sort, in ascending order of constituency.

Resignation and dissolution

On 14th Feb 2014, Arvind Kejriwal, after 49 days as Chief Minister resigned alleging that INC and BJP obstructed the Jan Lokpal Bill. Both, the INC and BJP refuted the allegations made by Kejriwal. The outgoing Chief Minister, vide a letter to President of India Pranab Mukherjee and Lieutenant Governor of Delhi Najeeb Jung recommended immediate dissolution of the State Assembly and to conduct elections immediately.

The Legislative Assembly of Delhi was finally dissolved on 04 Nov 2014 and subsequently elections were announced by Election Commission of India.

See also

 First Legislative Assembly of Delhi
 Second Legislative Assembly of Delhi
 Third Legislative Assembly of Delhi
 Fourth Legislative Assembly of Delhi
 Sixth Legislative Assembly of Delhi
 Government of Delhi
 Legislative Assembly of Delhi
 1993, 1998, 2003, 2008, 2013 & 2015 Delhi Legislative Assembly elections.
Government of India
Politics of India
2013 Delhi Legislative Assembly election

References 

Indian politics articles by importance
Delhi Legislative Assembly